Jim Munroe is a Canadian science fiction author, who publishes his works independently under the imprint No Media Kings.

Munroe was managing editor at the magazine Adbusters in the 1990s, before publishing his debut novel Flyboy Action Figure Comes With Gasmask in 1999. The novel was put out by HarperCollins, a major publishing company owned by Rupert Murdoch, and though the book was successful, Munroe so disliked the experience that he launched No Media Kings as a venue for publishing and promoting his own works independently, and a guide to self-publishing for other prospective writers. The book was shortlisted for the Books in Canada First Novel Award in 2000.

In 2000, Munroe released Angry Young Spaceman through No Media Kings. He followed up with Everyone in Silico in 2002, which was promoted partly by Munroe's attempt to invoice corporations mentioned in the novel for product placement. An Opening Act of Unspeakable Evil, a novel written in the form of blog entries, followed in 2004.

Munroe's most recent books are Therefore Repent! and Sword of My Mouth, graphic novels set in post-Rapture Chicago and Detroit.

Munroe was the founder of Perpetual Motion Roadshow, a North American indie touring circuit that sent 100 writers, performers and musicians on the road between 2003 and 2007. A former video games columnist for Eye Weekly, he is a founding board member of the Hand Eye Society and has produced projects such as the Torontron.

Bibliography 
Flyboy Action Figure Comes with Gasmask (1999)
Angry Young Spaceman (2000)
Everyone in Silico (2002)
An Opening Act of Unspeakable Evil (2004)
Therefore Repent! (2007)
Sword of My Mouth (2010)

References

External links
 No Media Kings

Canadian science fiction writers
Living people
Writers from Toronto
Canadian graphic novelists
Canadian male novelists
20th-century Canadian novelists
21st-century Canadian novelists
Canadian columnists
20th-century Canadian male writers
21st-century Canadian male writers
Canadian male non-fiction writers
Year of birth missing (living people)